Ewshot is a village and civil parish in Hampshire, England. It lies in the north east of the county, close to the Surrey border.

The name Ewshot comes from Old English and means corner or angle of land where yew trees grow.

Ewshot consists of Ewshot Village proper, a later development known as Ewshot Heights plus the outlying hamlets of Beacon Hill, Warren, Dora's Green and a newer estate of large houses originally called Marlborough Hill at the top of Beacon Hill towards Farnham. Ewshot forms part of the Hundred of Crondall, which has origins dating back to the Domesday Book.  It has a small Village Hall, a Residents Association.

The nearest towns are Fleet, Hampshire and Farnham, Surrey.

There is one Public House in Ewshot, called The Windmill.

Ewshot is the home of the Church of St Mary, which was founded in 1873 and built in the Early English style.

Ewshot falls under the auspices of Hart District Council, for local issues while Hampshire County Council administers the whole County. The nearby Bricksbury Hill, a mile to the east, rises to 187 metres (614 feet) above sea level.

References

External links

Villages in Hampshire